The 19th Grand National Assembly of Turkey existed from November 6, 1991, to December 24, 1995, with most members having been elected in the 1991 election. The True Path Party of Süleyman Demirel gained a majority of seats in the Assembly, being followed by the Motherland Party, the Social Democratic Populist Party, the Welfare Party, and the Democratic Left Party in decreasing order.

Incidents
On 2 March 1994, Parliament lifted the immunity of Hatip Dicle, an MP from (and chairperson of) the Democracy Party who was among those cross-endorsed by and caucusing with the SHP, and on the same day he was arrested. On 8 December 1994 he was convicted, with Leyla Zana, Orhan Doğan and Selim Sadak, of membership in an organization (PKK) and sentenced to 15 years in prison.

Officers
 Prime Minister: Süleyman Demirel (up to 25 June 1993) - Tansu Çiller (from 25 June 1993)
 Leader of the Opposition: Mesut Yılmaz
 Speaker: Hüsamettin Cindoruk

Members

Terms of the Grand National Assembly of Turkey
Social Democratic Populist Party (Turkey)
Democrat Party (Turkey, current)
Motherland Party (Turkey)
Democratic Left Party (Turkey)
Welfare Party
Republican People's Party (Turkey)
Political history of Turkey